Magic Fly is video game for the Amiga and Atari  ST published by Electronic Arts in 1990.

Gameplay
Magic Fly is a game in which the player pilots a ship into the interior of an asteroid.

Reception
Allen L. Greenberg reviewed the game for Computer Gaming World, and stated that "Magic Fly is a welcome addition to the small group of science-fiction combat/flight simulators for the Amiga and Atari ST. Its greatest strength lies in the large degree of strategy and exploration present in the game. Graphically, the program offers enough to keep one playing, although it is very much lacking in visual fireworks."

Tom Malcom for Info gave the game 4 stars and stated "Fine stuff; I'll be spending a lot more time with this one." 

Damon Howarth for Page 6 described it as "A game that could achieve the same sort of status as Elite."

Reviews
ST Format - Sep, 1990
Amiga Format - Oct, 1990
Amiga Action - Dec, 1990
Computer and Video Games - Nov, 1990
ASM (Aktueller Software Markt) - Nov, 1990
Amiga Power - May, 1991
Amiga World - May, 1991

References

1990 video games
Amiga games
Atari ST games
Fiction about asteroids
Video games set in outer space